Yevpatoria Bay is a bay in the Black Sea near Yevpatoria, Crimea.

References

Bays of Crimea
Yevpatoria
Bays of the Black Sea